The 6th Seiyu Awards ceremony was held on March 3, 2012.

References

Seiyu Awards ceremonies
Seiyu
Seiyu
2012 in Japanese cinema
2012 in Japanese television